Monika Hamann ( Meyer; born 8 June 1954 in Waren) is a retired East German sprinter who specialized in the 100 and 200m. She represented the sports team SC Neubrandenburg.

Biography
Meyer competed at the 1971 European Championships, without reaching the final, and won the silver medal in 60 m at the 1975 European Indoor Championships. At the 1978 European Championships she finished fourth in the 100 m and 200 m and won a bronze medal in the 4 x 100 m relay together with Johanna Klier, Carla Bodendorf und Marlies Göhr.

Her personal best time was 11.03 seconds, achieved in July 1977 in Dresden. This result ranks her ninth among German 100 m sprinters, behind Marlies Göhr, Marita Koch, Silke Gladisch, Katrin Krabbe, Heike Drechsler, Bärbel Wöckel, Annegret Richter and Romy Müller.

See also

 German all-time top lists - 100 metres

References

1954 births
Living people
East German female sprinters
European Athletics Championships medalists
People from Waren (Müritz)
Sportspeople from Mecklenburg-Western Pomerania